Local nature reserves (LNRs) in England are designated by local authorities under Section 21 of the National Parks and Access to the Countryside Act 1949. LNRs are sites which have a special local interest either biologically or geologically. Local authorities have a duty to care for them, and must control the sites by owning or leasing them, or by having an agreement with the owners.  The local authorities can apply local byelaws to manage and protect LNRs.

As of January 2020, there are forty-one LNRs in Berkshire. Five are also Sites of Special Scientific Interest, two are Special Areas of Conservation and four are managed by the Berkshire, Buckinghamshire and Oxfordshire Wildlife Trust.

Berkshire is a county in South East England. It is bordered by Hampshire and Surrey to the south, Greater London to the east, Wiltshire to the west and Buckinghamshire and Oxfordshire to the north. Berkshire lies in the valleys of the Thames and its tributary, the River Kennet, and in the west it is crossed by chalk hills. It has a population of more than 860,000. It is no longer an administrative county following the abolition of Berkshire County Council in 1998. It is governed by six unitary authorities: Bracknell Forest, Reading, Slough, West Berkshire, Windsor and Maidenhead and Wokingham.

Key

Other designations and wildlife trust management
BBOWT = Berkshire, Buckinghamshire and Oxfordshire Wildlife Trust
SAC = Special Area of Conservation
SSSI = Site of Special Scientific Interest

Sites

See also
List of Sites of Special Scientific Interest in Berkshire
Berkshire, Buckinghamshire and Oxfordshire Wildlife Trust

Notes

References

 
Berkshire
Local Nature Reserves